FC Antratsyt Kirovske was a football club from Kirovske, Ukraine. In 1992 and 1992–93 it participated in professional competitions of lower leagues. After 1993 Antratsyt withdrew from competitions.

League and cup history
Soviet Union (Ukrainian SSR)
{|class="wikitable"
|-bgcolor="#efefef"
! Season
! Div.
! Pos.
! Pl.
! W
! D
! L
! GS
! GA
! P
!Domestic Cup
!colspan=2|Europe
!Notes
|-bgcolor=SkyBlue
|align=center|1990
|align=center rowspan=3|4th
|align=center|6
|align=center|30
|align=center|15
|align=center|6
|align=center|9
|align=center|34
|align=center|30
|align=center|36
|align=center|N/A
|align=center|
|align=center|
|align=center|
|-bgcolor=SkyBlue
|align=center rowspan=2|1991
|align=center bgcolor=gold|1
|align=center|30
|align=center|24
|align=center|5
|align=center|1
|align=center|64
|align=center|20
|align=center|53
|align=center rowspan=2|N/A
|align=center rowspan=2|
|align=center rowspan=2|
|align=center|
|-bgcolor=SkyBlue
|align=center|6
|align=center|5
|align=center|0
|align=center|0
|align=center|5
|align=center|4
|align=center|10
|align=center|0
|align=center|
|}

Ukraine
{|class="wikitable"
|-bgcolor="#efefef"
! Season
! Div.
! Pos.
! Pl.
! W
! D
! L
! GS
! GA
! P
!Domestic Cup
!colspan=2|Europe
!Notes
|-bgcolor=PowderBlue
|align=center|1992
|align=center|3rd "B"
|align=center|8
|align=center|16
|align=center|2
|align=center|3
|align=center|11
|align=center|15
|align=center|32
|align=center|7
|align=center|1/16 finals
|align=center|
|align=center|
|align=center bgcolor=red|Relegated
|-bgcolor=SkyBlue
|align=center|1992–93
|align=center|3rd 
|align=center bgcolor=#A67D3D|3
|align=center|34
|align=center|22
|align=center|5
|align=center|7
|align=center|46
|align=center|32
|align=center|49
|align=center|N/A
|align=center|
|align=center|
|align=center bgcolor=red|Withdrewas Hirnyk Hirne (first half)
|}

 
Football clubs in Donetsk Oblast
Defunct football clubs in Ukraine
Association football clubs disestablished in the 1990s
1990s disestablishments in Ukraine